Le Bousquet-d'Orb  (Languedocien: Lo Bosquet d’Òrb) is a commune in the Hérault department in southern France.

Population

See also
Communes of the Hérault department

References

Communes of Hérault